The 2018–19 season will be Al-Minaa's 43nd season in the Iraqi Premier League, having featured in all 45 editions of the competition except two. Al-Minaa are participating in the Iraqi Premier League and the Iraq FA Cup.

They enter this season having finished in a disappointing 15th place in the league in the 2017–18 season, and will be looking to wrestle back the title they won in the 1977–78 season.

Squad

Transfers

In

Out

Personnel

Technical staff
{| class="toccolours"
!bgcolor=silver|Position
!bgcolor=silver|Name
!bgcolor=silver|Nationality
|- bgcolor=#eeeeee
|Manager:||Ahmad Sabri (caretaker)||
|- 
| Goalkeeping coach:||Saddam Salman ||
|-bgcolor=#eeeeee
| Fitness coach:||Hicham Ghazia||
|-
|Administrative director:||Jihad Madlool||
|-bgcolor=#eeeeee
| Club doctor:||Faris Abdullah||
|-

Board members

Goalscorers

Last updated: 22 July 2019

Clean sheets

Last updated: 22 July 2019

Penalties

Overall statistics

Last updated: 22 July 2019

References

External links
 Results of Al-Minaa SC on a FIFA.COM 
 Iraqi League 2018/2019
 Al-Minaa SC: Transfers and News

Al-Mina'a SC seasons